Lucia-Maria Näfen-Zehnder, née Näfen (born 25 November 1962), is a Swiss ski mountaineer, long-distance runner and politician of the Christian Democratic People's Party of Switzerland Upper Valais (CVPO).

Näfen is married with three children, and lives in Brig-Glis, where she was elected into the municipal council in 2008.

Selected results

Ski mountaineering 
 2009:
 3rd, Zermatt-Rothorn run

Patrouille des Glaciers 

 2004: 5th, together with Nathalie Etzensperger and Brigitte Wolf
 2008: 10th, together with Cornelia Ritler and Andrea Strohmeier

Trofeo Mezzalama 

 2009: 7th, together with Birgit Hosner and Annick Rey
 2011: 8th, together with Marlen Knutti and Monika Ziegler

Pierra Menta 

 2011: 9th, together with Cécile Pasche
 2012: 8th, together with Cécile Pasche

Running 
 2001:
 3rd, Jeizibärg-Lauf, Gampel
 2002:
 1st (women II), Jeizibärg-Lauf, Gampel
 2003:
 1st (women II), Jeizibärg-Lauf, Gampel
 2004:
 1st (women II), Jeizibärg-Lauf, Gampel
 2005:
 1st (women II), Jeizibärg-Lauf, Gampel
 1st (women II), Jeizibärg-Lauf & Dérupe Vercorin Trophy
 2nd (F40), Matterhorn run
 2006:
 2nd (women 1), Jeizibärg-Lauf & Dérupe Vercorin Trophy
 3rd (F40), Matterhorn run
 3rd (women II), Jeizibärg-Lauf, Gampel
 2007:
 1st (women 1), Jeizibärg-Lauf, Gampel
 2008:
 2nd (F45), Matterhorn run
 3rd (women 1), Jeizibärg-Lauf / Valais Mountain Running Championship, Gampel
 4th (women 1), Dérupe Vercorin
 2009:
 3rd (women I), Jeizibärg-Lauf / Upper Valais Running Cup / Valais Mountain Running Cup, Gampel
 2010:
 2nd (women II), Hohsaas mountain run
 3rd (F45), Matterhorn run
 3rd (women I), Jeizibärg-Lauf / Mountain Running Cup, Gampel
 2011:
 2nd (women I), Jeizibärg-Lauf, Gampel

External links 
 Lucia Näfen, skimountaineering.org

References 

1962 births
Living people
Swiss female ski mountaineers
Swiss female long-distance runners
Swiss female mountain runners
Christian Democratic People's Party of Switzerland politicians
People from Brig-Glis
21st-century Swiss women politicians
21st-century Swiss politicians
Swiss sportsperson-politicians
Canton of Valais politicians